Ardisia japonica, known as marlberry, is a species of Ardisia native to eastern Asia, in eastern China, Japan and Korea.

Growth
It is a low-growing, spreading very quickly evergreen shrub 20–40 cm tall. The leaves are opposite or in whorls, ovate, 4–7 cm long and 1.5–4 cm broad, with a sharply serrated margin and an acute apex. The flowers are 4–10 mm diameter, with five (rarely six) white to pale pink petals; they are produced in racemes in late spring. The fruit is a drupe 5–6 mm diameter, red maturing dark purple-black in early winter.

Uses
A number of cultivars have been selected for growing as ornamental plants, including 'Hakuokan' and 'Ito Fukurin' with variegated leaves, 'Hinotsukasa', with pale cream-coloured leaves, and 'Matsu Shima' with pink stems and variegated leaves.

The plant is called Jūryō (十両) in Japanese. Because of the red berries and the word play of its name it is used during Japanese New Year for chabana decoration, normally along winter jasmine. Another plant used instead because of its similarity is the coralberry tree and Sarcandra glabra.

Medicinal uses
It is used as a medicinal plant in traditional Chinese medicine, where it is called zǐjīn niú, or aidicha (矮地茶) and is considered one of the 50 Fundamental Herbs.

Large doses of the plant as medicine can be toxic to the kidneys.

Weed problems
It has escaped from cultivation and established itself in the wild in the United States, in Gainesville, Florida.

See also
 Chinese herbology
 Ardisia crenata, (waxy leaves and red berries) also known as coral bush, coralberry tree, or spiceberry.

References

External links

 Ardisia japonica Chemical Compounds (Dr. Duke's Databases)

japonica
Plants used in traditional Chinese medicine
Medicinal plants of Asia
Plants described in 1781